Dexter Myles Jackson (born August 5, 1986) is a former American football wide receiver. He was drafted by the Tampa Bay Buccaneers in the second round of the 2008 NFL Draft. He played college football at Appalachian State. Jackson was also a member of the Carolina Panthers, Virginia Destroyers, New York Jets and High Country Grizzlies.

Early years
He attended and played high school football at Dunwoody High School in Dunwoody, Georgia.

College career
Jackson proved key in one of college football's biggest upsets, recording two touchdowns and 92 yards as well as 19 yards rushing, in the Mountaineers' 34-32 Week 1 win over the No. 5 ranked Michigan Wolverines in 2007. A photograph of Jackson in the act of running the ball past the Michigan defense was run on the cover of the September 10, 2007 edition of Sports Illustrated.

Professional career

Pre-draft
At the NFL Scouting Combine, Jackson ran the manually timed 40-yard dash (4.27 seconds) faster than any other receiver which bumped his value up the Buccaneers' draft board.

Tampa Bay Buccaneers
Jackson was drafted by the Tampa Bay Buccaneers in the second round (58th overall) of the 2008 NFL Draft. On July 25, he signed a four-year contract. He played seven games for the team in 2008.

The Buccaneers waived Jackson on August 31, 2009.

Carolina Panthers
The Carolina Panthers signed Jackson to their practice squad on October 12, 2009. After his contract expired following the season, he was re-signed to a future contract on January 4, 2010. Jackson was waived by the Panthers on August 31, 2010.

Virginia Destroyers
Jackson was signed by the Virginia Destroyers of the United Football League on May 23, 2011.

New York Jets
Jackson was signed to the New York Jets' practice squad on November 9, 2011. He was released on November 19. He was re-signed to the practice squad on November 30. Jackson was waived on August 25, 2012.

High Country Grizzlies
On December 19, 2016, Jackson signed with the High Country Grizzlies of the National Arena League (NAL) to be the marquee player and face of the team for marketing and ticket sales during their inaugural 2017 season. He agreed to a contract that included sales incentives and a relocation reimbursement for Jackson and his family. Jackson initially requested his ticket sales incentives in February prior to the start of the season, but Jackson would leave the team over non-payment in May and the league suspended Jackson. In August, Jackson took the Grizzlies to arbitration with the league and the NAL ruled in Jackson's favor with the team owing Jackson US$9,500. Jackson filed another complaint with Watauga County over continued non-payment by the team as of January 2018.

References

External links
Carolina Panthers bio

1986 births
Living people
People from Decatur, Georgia
Players of American football from Georgia (U.S. state)
Sportspeople from DeKalb County, Georgia
American football wide receivers
American football return specialists
Appalachian State Mountaineers football players
Tampa Bay Buccaneers players
Carolina Panthers players
Virginia Destroyers players
New York Jets players
High Country Grizzlies players
Dunwoody High School alumni